Mohamed Sifan (born 8 March 1983) is a Maldivian footballer, nicknamed "Kudattey", who currently plays for New Radiant SC. He also plays for the Maldives national football team. He is from the island of Eydhafushi, Baa Atoll.

International goals 

Scores and results list Maldives' goal tally first.

Honours

Maldives
 SAFF Championship: 2008

References

External links
Player profile at soccer.com.mv
2011 SAFF Championship Squad at maldivesoccer.net

1983 births
Living people
Maldivian footballers
Maldives international footballers
New Radiant S.C. players
Victory Sports Club players
Association football midfielders
Footballers at the 2006 Asian Games
Asian Games competitors for the Maldives